Bernadette Constantin is a French former footballer who played as a midfielder for French club  ASJ Soyaux of the Division 1 Féminine.

International career

Constantin represented France 44 times from 1978 to 1994 .

References

1969 births
ASJ Soyaux-Charente players
French women's footballers
Division 1 Féminine players
Women's association football midfielders
France women's international footballers
Women's association football managers
Living people